Dokri is a town in Larkana District,  Sindh province of Pakistan and is the capital town of the Dokri Taluka. The town is located at 27° 22' 29" N 68° 05' 50" E and has an elevation of 39 metres.

References 

Larkana District
Populated places in Sindh